The 1995–96 Purdue Boilermakers men's basketball team represented Purdue University as a member of the Big Ten Conference during the 1995–96 NCAA Division I men's basketball season. The team was led by Gene Keady and played its home games at Mackey Arena.

Roster

Schedule and results

|-
!colspan=9 style=| Non-conference regular season

|-
!colspan=9 style=| Big Ten regular season

|-
!colspan=9 style=| NCAA tournament

Rankings

NCAA infractions
In 1997 the NCAA began investigating claims of recruiting infractions by Purdue.  The Committee on Infractions alleged that assistant coach and top recruiter Frank Kendrick and Purdue booster Bill Powers arranged for a loan of $4,000 in 1995 to recruit Luther Clay.  Clay's understanding was that he did not need to pay back the loan, and records show that no attempt was made to recover it.  Additionally, Kendrick arranged for a booster to provide housing and transportation for former Boilermaker Porter Roberts' mother.  Both claims are denied by Purdue (in the latter case specifically, that the booster was not a Purdue booster, and therefore allowed to provide services as he saw fit).  Furthermore, the committee discovered that Kendrick made 15 calls to Jamaal Davis in 1996 and told him to lie about an improper ride he received during a campus visit.  Davis signed with Purdue for the 1997–98 but didn't play his freshman year due to academic ineligibility.  He would go on to play 12 games the following year before transferring to Cincinnati in 1999.

In 1999 the NCAA Division I Committee on Infractions ruled that Purdue had violated laws involving recruiting, extra benefits, and ethical conduct, as well as several secondary violations in the women's basketball program.  As a result, Purdue was to repay approximately $80,000 (reduced from around $900,000) in earnings it received from their 1996 NCAA tournament appearance.  Purdue received two years probation and dissociation of 2 representatives of the university athletic interests and Kendrick was banned from off-campus recruiting for a year.  The basketball program was to reduce the number of official recruiting visits from 12 to 4 per year for the 1999–2000 and 2000–01 seasons, and lost one scholarship (limiting them to 12 per season) for the 2000–01 and 2001–02 academic years.  Kendrick was fined an undisclosed amount and was subject to an NCAA "show-cause" requirement for 1 year.  Finally, Purdue was forced to forfeit the 24 games in which Luther Clay participated (18 regular season wins) and vacate its 2 NCAA games (1 win and 1 loss).  The forfeited games would be recorded as losses for Purdue and wins for their opponent, whereas the vacated games would simply remove the result from Purdue's record with no change to the opponent's.  The forfeits were among the steepest at the time.  The Big Ten conference allowed Purdue to retain their title as regular season champions despite the change in conference records.

Purdue maintains that none of Clay's on-court actions affected game outcomes, scoring only 60 points the entire season, including 13 points in 12 conference games.  Clay would transfer to Rhode Island after one season with Purdue.  Kendrick left the Purdue basketball program in 1999.  The Big Ten had multiple basketball scandals around this time, including the University of Michigan basketball scandal and the University of Minnesota basketball scandal.

See also
1996 NCAA Division I men's basketball tournament
List of NCAA Division I institutions

Notes

References

Purdue Boilermarkers
Purdue Boilermakers men's basketball seasons
Purd
Purd
Purdue